Miaoshan is a town in Tancheng County, Shandong province, China. , it has 8 rural communities under its administration: 
Miaoshan Community
Lichao Community
Mazhan Community
Lequan Community
Qianlin Community
Dabu Community
Xincheng Community
Xuezhuang Community

See also 
 List of township-level divisions of Shandong

References 

Township-level divisions of Shandong
Tancheng County